The Bob Crosby Show can refer to either of two television programs in the United States. One was broadcast in the afternoons on CBS September 14, 1953 – August 30, 1957. The other was broadcast in prime time on NBC June 14, 1958 – September 6, 1958, as a summer replacement for Perry Como's show.

Personnel
Singer/bandleader Bob Crosby was the host and star of both programs. Other entertainers on the CBS version included Joan O'Brien, Cathy Crosby and The Modernaires. The announcers were Steve Dunne and Jack Narz. Crosby's Bobcats orchestra provided instrumental music. The NBC program featured Gretchen Wyler, The Clay Warnick Singers and The Peter Gennaro Dancers. Carl Hoff led the orchestra, and the producer was Louis DaPron.

Recognition
Readers of TV Radio Mirror magazine named The Bob Crosby Show their favorite television daytime variety program for 1954–1955. In 1955, the show was nominated for an Emmy Award for Outstanding Program Achievement In Daytime.

Recording
Columbia Records issued a Bob Crosby Show album (CL 766), featuring Crosby, Paula Kelly and Carol Richards.

References

External links
A 1953 episode of The Bob Crosby Show from the Internet Archive
A 1955 episode of The Bob Crosby Show from the Internet Archive

CBS original programming
NBC original programming
1953 American television series debuts
1958 American television series debuts
1957 American television series endings
1958 American television series endings